Serge Ognadon Akakpo (born 15 October 1987) is a Togolese footballer who played as a centre-back.

Career

Club
Akakpo began his career with Auxerre after breaking through the youth academy, he made his first-team debut with Auxerre in July 2007. Akakpo left Auxerre on a free transfer in January 2009 and moved to Liga I team Vaslui in Romania on a lucrative deal. He subsequently had spells with Celje and Žilina in Slovenia and Slovakia respectively. In 2014, Akakpo joined Ukrainian club FC Hoverla Uzhhorod. He made 30 Premier League appearances for Hoverla before leaving. Akakpo played for 1461 Trabzon of TFF First League in 2015 prior to completing a loan move to Süper Lig team Trabzonspor, after seven appearances the club signed him on a permanent contract. On 31 January 2017, Akakpo joined Turkish second-tier side Gaziantep BB.

International
Akakpo has represented the Togo national football team since 2008, becoming captain on numerous occasions. He played his first international game for Togo, on 10 September 2008, against Zambia in Chililabombwe. Before representing Togo, he played for France at U17 and U19 level and also played one match for the Benin B national team. In January 2010, Akakpo was one of the players involved when the Togo national team's bus came under a gunfire attack on the way to the 2010 Africa Cup of Nations in Angola.

Career statistics

International
.

International goals
. Scores and results list Zimbabwe's goal tally first.

Personal life
Akakpo is, along with his former teammate Irélé Apo, of Beninense and Togolese descent, he holds also besides the French passport.

Honours

Club
Žilina
Slovak Super Liga (1): 2011–12
Slovak Cup (1): 2011–12

References

External links
 
 Serge Akakpo at AJ Auxerre official site.
 Serge Akakpo at Skynetblogs
 
 Serge Akakpo at Foot-national.com
 
 Serge Akakpo on Žilina page 
 
 
 

1987 births
Living people
Sportspeople from Lomé
Togolese footballers
Togo international footballers
French footballers
Association football defenders
Survivors of terrorist attacks
AJ Auxerre players
FC Vaslui players
NK Celje players
MŠK Žilina players
FC Hoverla Uzhhorod players
1461 Trabzon footballers
Trabzonspor footballers
Gaziantep F.K. footballers
FC Arsenal Kyiv players
Ligue 1 players
Liga I players
Slovak Super Liga players
Ukrainian Premier League players
TFF First League players
Süper Lig players
Citizens of Benin through descent
Beninese people of Togolese descent
Sportspeople of Togolese descent
French sportspeople of Togolese descent
French sportspeople of Beninese descent
France youth international footballers
2010 Africa Cup of Nations players
2013 Africa Cup of Nations players
2017 Africa Cup of Nations players
Togolese expatriate footballers
Expatriate footballers in France
Expatriate footballers in Romania
Expatriate footballers in Slovenia
Expatriate footballers in Slovakia
Expatriate footballers in Ukraine
Expatriate footballers in Turkey
Togolese expatriate sportspeople in Romania
Togolese expatriate sportspeople in Slovenia
Togolese expatriate sportspeople in Slovakia
Togolese expatriate sportspeople in Ukraine
Togolese expatriate sportspeople in Turkey
Black French sportspeople